Oscar Barreto (born 28 April 1993) is a Colombian professional footballer who plays as a right winger for Peruvian club Unión Comercio.

External links

1993 births
Footballers from Bogotá
Living people
Colombian footballers
Association football midfielders
La Equidad footballers
Millonarios F.C. players
Rio Ave F.C. players
Sport Huancayo footballers
C.D. Santa Clara players
Unión Comercio footballers
Categoría Primera A players
Primeira Liga players
Peruvian Primera División players
Colombian expatriate footballers
Expatriate footballers in Portugal
Colombian expatriate sportspeople in Portugal
Expatriate footballers in Peru
Colombian expatriate sportspeople in Peru